Fortunata y Jacinta is a 1980 limited television series consisting of an adaptation of 1887 Benito Pérez Galdós' novel Fortunata y Jacinta. Directed by Mario Camus, it was produced by Televisión Española (TVE) in collaboration with French TeleFrance and Swiss Telvetia. It starred Ana Belén as Fortunata and Maribel Martín as Jacinta. It originally aired on the flagship TVE channel.

Premise 
The fiction is set in Madrid from 1869 to 1876. It tracks the lives of the well-off Jacinta (Maribel Martín) and the lower-class Fortunata (Ana Belén) as well as their families and neighbors, depicting features such as the poverty, malice, greedness or social privilege of the time.

Cast 
 Ana Belén as Fortunata.
 Maribel Martín as Jacinta.
 François-Éric Gendron as Juanito Santa Cruz.
  as Maximiliano Rubín.
 Paco Algora as Nicolás.
 Fernando Fernán Gómez as Evaristo Feijoo.
 Charo López as Mauricia la Dura.
 Mary Carrillo as Barbarita.
 Francisco Rabal as José Izquierdo.
 Berta Riaza as Guillermina Pacheco.
 Luisa Ponte as Doña Lupe la de los Pavos.
 Mirta Miller as Aurora.
  as Villalonga.

Production and release 
Fortunata y Jacinta was directed by Mario Camus. Produced by Televisión Española (TVE) in collaboration with French TeleFrance and Swiss Telvetia, the series had a 160 million peseta budget, an expensive budget at the time. It was filmed from  14 May to 5 December 1979. Besides the lavish set prepared to represent the Madrilenian , outdoor scenes were also shot in Madrid, Aranjuez, Boadilla del Monte, Villaviciosa de Odón, Toledo, Comillas, Burgos and Seville.

The series consisted of ten episodes with a running time of roughly 60 minutes.

It originally aired on TVE-1 from 7 May 1980 to 22 May 1980. The series re-aired in Spain multiple times: 1983 (TVE-2), 1987 (TVE-1), 2005 (Canal Nostalgia) and 2007 (TVE 50 Años). It was broadcast again on La 2 in 2020 on the occasion of the "Galdosian year".

It was released in VHS format in 1994 and in DVD format in 2004.

References 

Television series set in the 1860s
Television shows filmed in Spain
1980s Spanish drama television series
Television series set in the 1870s
Television shows set in Madrid
1980 Spanish television series debuts
1980 Spanish television series endings
Television series based on Spanish novels
La 1 (Spanish TV channel) network series